Bandula Lal Bandarigoda is a Sri Lankan politician. He is a current member of the parliament of Sri Lanka for Galle District. Bandarigoda is member of the United National Party and he previously served as a member of the Southern Provincial Council, before electing to the parliament. He had his education at Nagoda Royal National College.

References

External links
 Official website

Members of the 15th Parliament of Sri Lanka
United National Party politicians
Living people
Year of birth missing (living people)